John Ewart Beswick (5 April 1897 – 20 February 1978) was an English footballer who played in the Football League for Stoke.

Career
Beswick was a defender who had two spells as the Victoria Ground, He was described as an intelligent ball playing centre-half who gave nothing away. The retired through injury at the end of his second spell, Beswick was one of the most successful amateurs to have served the club and helped Stoke to the Third Division North Title in 1926–27.

He was also a member of the famous pottery family Beswick, he continued to run the John Beswick Ltd company after his retirement from football until his death in 1978.

Career statistics

Honours
with Stoke City
Football League Third Division North Champions: 1926–27

References

English footballers
Stoke City F.C. players
English Football League players
1897 births
Sportspeople from Macclesfield
Congleton Town F.C. players
1978 deaths
Association football midfielders